Sneeze or 41 Songs In 47 Minutes (HAC50) as it is also known, is the first album by Australian band Sneeze. On the cover, tracks 1, 22-41 are marked as "bonus tracks" - the rest were initially released as a double 7 inch vinyl (Moo 08). Total running time of the album is 47 minutes, the track Demand is the shortest song at 18 seconds, Back Down the longest at 1:58.

Personnel
 Tom Morgan
 Nic Dalton
 Ben Aylward
 Evan Dando
 Simon Day
 Paul Duncan
 Allison Galloway
 Simon Holmes
 Michael Levis
 David Lord
 Geoff Milne
 Nicole Moore
 Jesse Peretz
 Stevie Plunder
 Alannah Russack
 David Ryan
 Nicola Schultz
 Robyn St Clare

Track listing
 Sneeze Theme
 Ying and Yang Telephone
 Trouble In School
 2 Kates
 There He Is
 Commencing December
 Shakey Ground
 Doomed To Visit Disneyland
 Back Down
 Don't Go (Girlie)
 Demand
 Ripped Jeans
 (Cause You're So) Sweet
 Winter Won Out
 Pedal
 Accident Prone
 Satan
 Autumnal Eyes
 Baby Asleep
 Monday Night At Mars With Zero People
 Goodbye Vinyl
 Darth Vader Helmet
 Dad's Trailer
 Create Your Friends
 Better Days
 Photo Finish
 I'm Upset Enough (Parts 1&3)
 Could Run Or Walk
 Lolly Land
 You Put Me Where I Am Today
 Climbing Vulture Street
 Evil Star
 R
 She's Got A Boyfriend
 Pins And Needles
 Dice
 Cold Cold Morning
 (You're So) Patient
 Nevermind
 Explain Deep December
 Strawbreeze

1993 debut albums
Sneeze (band) albums